Acantharctia mundata is a species of moth of the family Erebidae. It was described by Francis Walker in 1865. It is found in the Democratic Republic of the Congo, Gabon, Ghana, Ivory Coast, Nigeria, Sierra Leone, the Gambia and Uganda.

References

Moths described in 1865
Spilosomina
Moths of Africa
Lepidoptera of West Africa
Lepidoptera of Uganda
Lepidoptera of Malawi